Ed Miracle is a self-taught American artist who creates paintings and sculptures as well as other works. He is a Navy veteran. Legal issues involving one of his paintings being used for the book cover of The World Is Flat were settled quietly in March 2006. He has a residence in Longboat Key, Florida.

See also 
 Riverwalk (Fort Lauderdale)

References

External links 
 http://www.miraclesart.com/ official website
 facebook

Living people
American contemporary painters
20th-century American sculptors
20th-century American male artists
American male sculptors
20th-century American painters
American male painters
Year of birth missing (living people)
People from Longboat Key, Florida